Parisi may refer to:
Johnny Swinger (born 1975), professional wrestler who performed under the name "Johnny Parisi"
Parisi (surname), an Italian surname
Parisi, São Paulo, a Brazilian municipality
Parisi (Yorkshire), an ancient tribe
Parisi Industries, Inc., a toy factory in Brooklyn, New York
Patsy Parisi, a fictional character from The Sopranos
Parisi v. Davidson, a United States Supreme Court case
Vila Parisi, a "favela" (slum) in Cubatão, Brazil
Villa Parisi, a villa in Monte Porzio Catone municipal territory, Italy*Villa Parisi, a villa in Monte Porzio Catone municipal territory, Italy

See also
Kardar–Parisi–Zhang equation
Parisii (disambiguation)

Italian-language surnames